Beautiful World is the fourth studio album by the British pop group Take That. Released on 27 November 2006, and was the band's first studio album in 11 years; it was also the band's first album to be released as a four-piece instead of the classic five-piece, without Robbie Williams, who had quit the group in 1995 and did not rejoin them until 2010. Five singles were released from the album: "Patience", "Shine", "I'd Wait for Life", the European-only single "Reach Out", and "Rule the World", which appeared on the deluxe tour edition. The album features what Take That describe as "a throwback to the 90s, but with a modern twist". Beautiful World is their first album in which every member of the band sings lead vocals on at least one song.

Singles
 "Patience" was released on 13 November 2006 as the first single from the album. The single peaked at the top of the UK Singles Chart, and also topped the charts in Germany, Spain and Switzerland, as well as peaking with the top ten of the charts in Denmark, Ireland, Italy, Austria and Sweden. The song also won the Best British Single Award at the 2007 BRIT Awards and was voted The Record of the Year for 2006, polling 15.5% of the final vote.
 "Shine" was released on 26 February 2007 as the second single from the album. The single peaked at #1 on the UK Singles Chart, and also peaked within the top ten in many other countries.
 "I'd Wait for Life" was released in the United Kingdom on 18 June 2007. The song became the band's first single to miss the top ten since 1992's "I Found Heaven", and ended the band's streak of six consecutive number ones. One week before the official release, the single charted at 109 on the UK Singles Chart, but jumped to number 17 after the single's official release. It slipped out of the Top 40 the second week. Since, it is rarely played during the band's live shows.
 "Reach Out" was released as the album's fourth single on 22 June 2007. The track was released exclusively in Europe, as an alternative to the British-only single "I'd Wait for Life". It performed well across Europe, peaking inside the top twenty in the Danish charts and narrowly missing the top ten in the Italian charts, peaking at #11. No official music video was produced for the release, although, the Italian division of Universal Music ran a competition for people to produce a music video based on the song, and the winning entry, directed by Alisha Antylla, was aired once on Total Request Live on MTV Italy.
 "Rule the World" was released on 21 October 2007 as the fifth and final single from the album, appearing on the Deluxe tour edition as one of three bonus tracks. The song was recorded for the soundtrack of the 2007 film Stardust. The single peaked at #2 on the UK Singles Chart, being held off the top spot by Leona Lewis' "Bleeding Love", it became the fifth best selling single of 2007.

Critical reception

Two weeks before the official UK release of Beautiful World, iTunes UK made the album available for pre-order. It immediately shot up the online music store's Top Albums list, peaking at number 1 on the day of the release. In December 2006, Take That became the only act to secure a #1 position in the download chart, UK albums chart, singles chart, airplay chart and the video chart.
The album received overwhelming positive reception from across the media, all praising the new musical direction that Take That had taken.
 InTheNews.co.uk

 MusicRemedy.com

Accolades
The lead single from the album, "Patience", won 'Best British Single' at the 2007 BRIT Awards and the second single "Shine" won 'Best British Single' at the 2008 BRIT Awards a year later.

Commercial performance
The album was number one in Ireland and the UK and was very well received critically. To date the album has sold over 3.5 million copies worldwide (including 2,850,000 in the UK alone, as of July 2016). The album was the 2nd best selling of 2006 in the UK, after only being on sale for one month. The album was also the 4th best selling album of 2007, and 33rd best selling of 2008.

The album has spent a total of 132 weeks (2 years and seven months) in the UK top 100. The album has been certified 9× Platinum in the UK, and as of 2014 is the 32nd best selling album in British music history.

Track listing

Personnel

Take That 
 Gary Barlow – vocals, acoustic piano
 Howard Donald – vocals
 Jason Orange – vocals 
 Mark Owen – vocals

Musicians 
 John Shanks – keyboards, guitars, bass 
 Jake Davies – additional keyboards (3)
 Jamie Muhoberac – additional keyboards (3, 8, 13 "Beautiful Morning")
 Steve Robson – acoustic piano (23)
 Luke Potashnick – guitars (23)
 Jeff Rothschild – drums
 Karl Brazil – percussion (23)
 L. Shankar – electric violin (11)
 Wil Malone – string arrangements (2, 4-11)
 Gavyn Wright – orchestra leader (2, 4-11)
 London Session Orchestra – orchestra (2, 4-11)
 The Millennia Ensemble – strings (15)
 Phil Shepherd – strings (23)
 Matthew Ward – strings (23)
 Grace Donald (Howard's daughter) – additional vocals (10)

Production 
 John Shanks – producer
 Steve Robson – producer (23)
 Jeff Rothschild – recording, mixing
 Richard Flack – recording (23), mixing (23)
 Robin Baynton, Chris Bolster, Andrew Dudman, Mike Horner, Jake Jackson, Lewis Jones and Sam Jones – assistant engineers
 Lars Fox – Pro Tools editing
 Ted Jensen – mastering at Sterling Sound (New York City, New York, USA)
 Shari Sutcliffe – production coordinator
 Studio Fury – art direction, design 
 Tom Craig – photography 
 Jonathan Wild and 10 Management – management

Charts

Weekly charts

Year-end charts

Decade-end charts

Certifications

Release history

References

2006 albums
Take That albums
Albums produced by John Shanks
Polydor Records albums